The fifteenth cycle of America's Next Top Model premiered on September 8, 2010 and was the ninth cycle to be aired on The CW network.

Several changes were made to the show in a bid to place greater emphasis on high fashion, including a lineup of prominent fashion industry guest judges as well as a change in prizes.

All three permanent judges from the previous cycle, Vogue editor-at-large André Leon Talley, photographer Nigel Barker and Tyra Banks, remained in place.

The prizes for this cycle included a modeling contract with IMG Models, a fashion spread in Vogue Italia, and both the cover and a spread in Beauty In Vogue, along with an editorial feature on Vogue.it, and a 100,000 contract with CoverGirl cosmetics. The international destinations for this cycle are Venice, Milan and Como, all in Italy.

The winner of the competition was 19-year-old Ann Ward from Dallas, Texas with Chelsey Hersley placing as the runner up.

Cast

Contestants
(Ages stated are at start of contest)

Judges
 Tyra Banks
 Nigel Barker
 André Leon Talley

Other cast members
J. Alexander – runway coach
Jay Manuel – creative director

Episodes

Summaries

Call-out order

 The contestant was eliminated
 The contestant was eliminated outside of the judging panel
  The contestant won the competition

Bottom two

 The contestant was eliminated after their first time in the bottom two
 The contestant was eliminated after their second time in the bottom two
 The contestant was eliminated after their third time in the bottom two
 The contestant was eliminated in the final judging and placed as the runner-up

Average  call-out order
Casting call-out order and final two are not included.

Photo shoots

 Episode 1 photo shoot: Paired up wearing Cynthia Rowley designs (casting)
 Episode 2 photo shoot: Teen bullying
 Episode 3 photo shoot: Fallen angels
 Episode 4 photo shoot: Underwater beauty shots
 Episode 5 photo shoot: Lucha Va Voom
 Episode 6 photo shoot: Walking down Rodeo Drive
 Episode 7 photo shoot: Portraying iconic fashion designers
 Episode 8 commercial: H2T water on roller skates
 Episode 9 photo shoot: Gondola group shoot with a casanova
 Episode 10 photo shoot: Marble statues coming to life
 Episode 11 motion editorial: Modelli folli ("Model Madness")
 Episode 13 photo shoot and commercial: CoverGirl Lash Blast Fusion print ad and commercial; beauty In Vogue spreads

Makeovers

 Terra – Cut short and dyed black
 Sara – Cut to shoulder length and dyed chocolate brown with bleached eyebrows
 Rhianna – Long wavy brown extensions with blonde highlights
 Lexie – Dyed light brown
 Kacey – Long black weave and contacts instead of glasses
 Kendal –  Long, straight middle-part black weave
 Esther – Dyed black
 Liz – Pixie cut
 Chris – Long wavy dark brown weave 
 Kayla – Cut to shoulder length with bangs and dyed bright red with bleached eyebrows
 Jane – Dyed light brown with blonde highlights
 Chelsey – Trimmed, dyed ice blonde and tooth gap accentuated
 Ann – Long copper brown extensions

Post-Top Model careers 

 Ann Ward won a contract with CoverGirl, a contract with IMG Models, and a spread in Vogue Italia. Since then, she has booked some ad campaigns with small designers, appeared in Velvet Magazine, and walked in some high fashion runway shows. She also posts artwork online.
 Chelsey Hersley signed with Passport Model Management in San Francisco and Urban Talent Management in Boise.
 Jane Randall signed with IMG Models. She has appeared in Vogue Italia, the New York Times Magazine, and on the cover of Women's Wear Daily. She has models for Saks Fifth Avenue, Bloomingdale's, and other retailers online, and walked in runway shows at New York Fashion Week in 2011 and 2012. In 2017, she started to run "The Jersey Report," a New Jersey-focused right wing blog.
 Kayla Ferrel signed with a modeling agency in Japan and participated in season 17 of Top Model.
 Chris White declared a desire to start acting again after the show.
 Liz Williams declared a desire to continue modeling or be a television host after the show and pursued a degree in architecture. She has taken test shots and appeared on the cover of TyraMag.
 Esther Petrack studied Hebrew at Hebrew University in Jerusalem after appearing on the show. She emigrated to Israel in 2012 and joined the IDF.
 Kendal Brown declared a desire to continue modeling in Atlanta after the show.
 Kacey Leggett has continued to model, including at Miami Swim Week in 2018 and in an advertisement for Mia Beccar. She is represented by TNG Models in Las Vegas.
 Lexie Tomchek has done test shots but declared a hesitancy about continuing to model after the show, and declared a desire to pursue acting in Chicago.
 Rhianna Atwood was signed by Paragon Model Management in Mexico City and appeared in Refix Magazine.
 Sara Blackamore did not state a desire to continue modeling after the show.
 Terra White has pursued modeling but has not been signed by an agency.
 Anamaria Mirdita has taken test shots.

Notes

References

External links
Official website

A15
2010 American television seasons
Television shows filmed in California
Television shows filmed in Italy